58th Division or 58th Infantry Division may refer to:

 Infantry divisions 
 58th Division (People's Republic of China)
 58th Infantry Division (German Empire) 
 58th Infantry Division (Wehrmacht) 
58th Division (Imperial Japanese Army)
 58th Rifle Division (Soviet Union)
 58th Division (Sri Lanka)
 58th Infantry Division (United Kingdom)
 58th Infantry Division Legnano (Kingdom of Italy)
 58th Takavar Division of Shahroud
 Aviation divisions 
 58th Air Division (United States)

See also
 58th Regiment (disambiguation)
 58th Squadron (disambiguation)